Mensur Mujdža (born 28 March 1984) is a Bosnian former professional footballer who played as a right-back.

Mujdža started his professional career at Zagreb, before joining SC Freiburg in 2009. Seven years later, he moved to 1. FC Kaiserslautern.

A former Croatian youth international, Mujdža made his senior international debut for Bosnia and Herzegovina in 2010, earning over 30 caps until 2015. He represented the nation at their first major championship, the 2014 FIFA World Cup.

Club career

Early career
Mujdža came through youth setup of his hometown club Zagreb, which he joined in 1994. He made his professional debut in 2003 at the age of 19.

SC Freiburg
In June 2009, Mujdža was transferred to German outfit SC Freiburg for an undisclosed fee. He made his official debut for the team on 22 August against Bayer Leverkusen.

In January 2011, he extended his contract until June 2016.

On 28 April 2012, he scored scored his first goal for SC Freiburg in a triumph over 1. FC Köln.

Mujdža played his 100th game for the club on 18 October 2014 against VfL Wolfsburg.

In July 2015, he became team captain.

He was an important piece in SC Freiburg's capture of 2. Bundesliga title, his first trophy with the club, which was secured on 30 April 2016 and earned them promotion to Bundesliga just one season after being relegated.

Later stage of career
In August 2016, Mujdža signed with 1. FC Kaiserslautern.

He announced his retirement from football on 14 November 2017.

International career
Despite representing Croatia at various youth levels, Mujdža decided to play for Bosnia and Herzegovina at senior level.

In July 2010, his request to change sports citizenship from Croatian to Bosnian was approved by FIFA. Later that month, he received his first senior call-up, for a friendly game against Qatar, and debuted in that game on 10 August.

In June 2014, Mujdža was named in Bosnia and Herzegovina's squad for 2014 FIFA World Cup, country's first major competition. He made his tournament debut in the opening group match against Argentina on 15 June.

Personal life
Mujdža's older brother Jasmin was also a professional footballer.

Career statistics

Club

International

Honours
SC Freiburg
2. Bundesliga: 2015–16

References

External links

1984 births
Living people
Footballers from Zagreb
Citizens of Bosnia and Herzegovina through descent
Croatian footballers
Croatia youth international footballers
Croatia under-21 international footballers
Croatian expatriate footballers
Bosnia and Herzegovina footballers
Bosnia and Herzegovina international footballers
Bosnia and Herzegovina expatriate footballers
Association football fullbacks
NK Zagreb players
SC Freiburg players
1. FC Kaiserslautern players
Croatian Football League players
Bundesliga players
2. Bundesliga players
Expatriate footballers in Germany
Croatian expatriate sportspeople in Germany
Bosnia and Herzegovina expatriate sportspeople in Croatia
Bosnia and Herzegovina expatriate sportspeople in Germany
2014 FIFA World Cup players